Stolen Orders is a lost 1918 silent propaganda film directed by Harley Knoles and starring Kitty Gordon and Montagu Love.

Cast

Montagu Love – John Le Page
Kitty Gordon – Felicia Gaveston
June Elvidge – Ruth Le Page
Carlyle Blackwell – Lt. Dennis Gaveston
Madge Evans – Ruth Le Page, as a child
George MacQuarrie – Admiral Gaveston
Frank Leigh – Baron Kurdman
Edward Elkas – Maurice Levonshon
Robert Barring – Caversham
Dore Davidson – Mendel Hart
Philip W. Masi – Bertie Hart (*Philip Masse)
Walter Greene – Joe Allen
Marie Pagano – Mame
J. Gunnis Davis – Bill Cory
Jack Newton – Baron Charlier

References

External links
Stolen Orders at IMDb.com

1918 films
American silent feature films
Lost American films
American black-and-white films
Films directed by Harley Knoles
American films based on plays
World Film Company films
1910s American films